Celebrity Vinyl is a satirical coffee table book published in 2008 that chronicles the unsuccessful singing attempts of famous actors, actresses, and athletes. Published by Mark Batty Publisher, this book is based on the personal vinyl record collection of author and advertising creative director Tom Hamling.

Hamling writes that Celebrity Vinyl: "is not a study in pop culture. Or kitsch. Or really even music, for that matter. It's a study in the consecration of fame."

Celebrity albums included
Celebrity albums featured in the book include:
 Ed McMahon – And Me…I’m Ed McMahon
 Leonard Nimoy – Mr. Spock's Music From Outer Space
 Jimmy Swaggart – Down The Sawdust Trail
 David Hasselhoff – Night Rocker
 Muhammad Ali – The Adventure of Ali and His Gang Vs. Mr. Tooth Decay. A Children's Story
 Muhammad Ali – I’m The Greatest
 Bruce Willis – The Return of Bruno
 Ethel Merman – The Ethel Merman Disco Album
 John Travolta – 20 Golden Pieces of John Travolta
 Goldie Hahn – Goldie
 Rodney Dangerfield – Rappin’ Rodney
 Barbie – Barbie Sing-along
 Jesse Ventura – Jesse (The Body) Ventura
 Burt Reynolds – Ask Me What I Am
 Lisa Whelchel – All Because of You
 Mister Rogers – You Are Special
 William ‘The Refrigerator’ Perry – Fat Boys Chillin’ with the ‘Refrigerator’
 Chevy Chase – Chevy Chase
 Shaquille O’Neal – I’m Outstanding
 Scott Baio – Scott Baio
 Dick Van Dyke – Songs I Like
 The New York Islanders – A Christmas Album
 Louis Farrakhan – Let Us Unite
 Don Johnson – Heartbeat
 Philip Michael Thomas – Living the Book of My Life
 Philip Michael Thomas – Somebody
 Joe Piscopo – New Jersey
 Webster – Good Secrets! Bad Secrets! – The Important New Recording That Teaches Children How To AVOID Molestation!
 Colonel Sanders – Christmas Day With Colonel Sanders
 Jackie Gleason – How Sweet It Is For Lovers
 Eddie Murphy – So Happy
 Cheryl Ladd – Cheryl Ladd
 John Schneider – Tryin to Outrun the Wind
 Burgess Meredith – Songs and Stories of The Gold Rush
 Terry Bradshaw – Here In My Heart
 Raquel Welch – This Girl's Back In Town'''
 ABC Soap Opera Stars – Love In the Afternoon Mister Rogers – Let's Be Together Today Eddie Murphy – How Could It Be Shaquille O’Neal – shoot, pass, slam World Wrestling Federation - The Wrestling Album Gregory Hines – Gregory Hines Merv Griffin – A Tinkling Piano In the Next Apartment Jim Nabors – "Love Me With All Your Heart / Cuando Calienta el Sol" (?)
 Jimmy Swaggart – Jesus Will Outshine Them All Jimmy Swaggart – Songs From Mama's Songbook Telly Savalas – Telly The Cast of Dallas – Dallas – The Music Story William Shatner – Live Tracey Ullman – You Broke My Heart In 17 Places Mr. Magoo – Magoo in Hi-Fi David Cassidy – David Cassidy Jack Wagner – All I Need Barbie – Looking Good. Feeling Great. Exercise Album Morton Downey Jr. - Morton Downey Jr. Sings Tammy Faye Bakker – The Lord's On My Side (Psalm 124:2) John Davidson – Well, Here I Am. George DeWitt – Name That Tune Telly Savalas – The Two Sides of Telly Savalas Carol Burnett – If I Could Write a Song The Brady Bunch Kids – The Kids From The Brady Bunch Ted Knight – Hi Guys Jim Nabors – By Request Jerry Lewis – Just Sings The Brady Bunch Kids – Merry Christmas From the Brady Bunch Joe Piscopo – I Love Rock n’ Roll (Medley) John Davidson – Every Time I Sing a Love Song Lorne Greene – Welcome to the Ponderosa Lorne Greene – The Man George Burns – George Burns In Nashville Grace Jones – Fame Marilyn Monroe – The Very Best of Marilyn Monroe John Travolta – Can’t Let You Go Lisa Hartman – ‘Til My Heart Stops Jimmy Swaggart – Camp Meeting Piano Kristy & Jimmy McNichol - Kristy & Jimmy McNichol David Soul – Playing to An Audience of One Eddie Albert – The Eddie Albert Album Jim Nabors – Old Time Religion The Brady Bunch Kids – Meet the Brady Bunch Martin Mull – No Hits, Four Errors. The Best of Martin Mull The Colonel's Mandolin Band – Favorite Old Church Hymns Recorded For the Glorification Of Christ Professional Wrestlers – Wrestling Rocks John Travolta – John Travolta Smothers Brothers – The Smothers Brothers Play It Straight Robert Guillaume – I Who Have Nothing The Chicago Bears Shufflin’ Crew – The Super Bowl Shuffle The Cast Of The Beverly Hillbillies – The Beverly Hillbillies Lorne Greene – Have a Happy Holiday Rick Dees – I'm Not Crazy The Stars Of Gentle Ben – The Bear Facts Nipsey Russell – Sing Along With Nipsey Russell Don Johnson – Let It Roll Anthony Quinn – In My Own Way...I Love You Tony Randall And Jack Klugman – The Odd Couple Sings Andy Griffith – Somebody Bigger Than You and I Carroll O'Connor – Remembering You Laverne & Shirley – Laverne & Shirley Sing Sandra Bernhard – I'm Your Woman John Schneider – Take the Long Way Home Andy Griffith – This Here Jim and Tammy Faye Bakker – Building on the Rock Jimmy Swaggart – Camp Meeting Piano Shirley MacLaine – Live At The Palace Grace Jones – Living My Life  Tony Perkins – "On a Rainy Afternoon" Dallas Cowboys – The New Dallas Cowboys – Christmas ‘86 George Burns – A Musical Trip With George Burns Buddy Ebsen – Buddy Ebsen Says Howdy In Song and StoryReferences

External links
 Celebrity Vinyl website
 Celebrity Vinyl, Mark Batty Publisher web
 Article: "Criminal Records" The Independent''

2008 non-fiction books
American non-fiction books
Coffee table books